Big Peak may refer to:

Big Peak (Plumas County, California)
Big Peak (Camas County, Idaho)
Big Peak (Custer County, Montana), a mountain in Custer County, Montana

References